Chełmsko may refer to the following places in Poland:

Chełmsko, Lubusz Voivodeship
Chełmsko, West Pomeranian Voivodeship
Chełmsko Śląskie